The SIG Sauer P226 is a full-sized service pistol made by SIG Sauer. This model is sold in four chamberings: the 9×19mm Parabellum, .40 S&W, .357 SIG, or .22 Long Rifle. It has essentially the same basic design as the SIG Sauer P220, but is developed to use higher capacity, double stack magazines in place of the single stack magazines of the P220.

The P226 itself has spawned further sub-variants; the P228 and P229 are both compact versions of the double stack P226 design, while the P224 is a subcompact variant. The SIG Sauer P226 and its variants are in service with numerous law enforcement and military organizations worldwide.

History
Schweizerische Industrie Gesellschaft (SIG) is a Swiss company, now known as Swiss Arms. In 1975, SIG entered into an agreement with German gun manufacturer  J.P. Sauer & Sohn to develop and market a new handgun which became the P220. The P220 was the first SIG Sauer handgun sold in the US.  It was marketed initially by Browning as the Browning BDA. The SIG Sauer P220 is a refinement of the Petter-Browning design used in the SIG P210.  The locked breech design is very different and was pioneered by SIG Sauer. See also The first SIG Sauer Handgun.

The P226 was designed for entry into the XM9 Service Pistol Trials (see also Joint Service Small Arms Program) that were held by the US Army in 1984 on behalf of the US armed forces to find a replacement for the M1911A1 and 24 other makes of handgun in US military service. Only the Beretta 92SBF and the SIG P226 satisfactorily completed the trials. According to a GAO report, Beretta was awarded the M9 contract for the 92F due to a lower total package price. The P226 cost less per pistol than the 92F, but SIG's package price with magazines and spare parts was higher than Beretta's. The Navy SEALs, however, later chose to adopt the P226 as the P226 MK25 with special corrosion protection.

For the U.S. military XM9 trials, the P226 was imported by Saco Defense. Interarms took over importing when the pistol was introduced for civilian sales. SIG Sauer eventually founded SIGARMS, Inc. (now SIG Sauer) in the United States to handle importation of their products. In 2000, SIG Holding AG sold J.P. Sauer & Sohn GmbH to two German businessmen. The brand name SIG Sauer remained at J.P. Sauer & Sohn GmbH.

Manufacture
SIG Sauer firearms are manufactured in Eckernförde, Germany by Sig Sauer, GmbH and in Newington, New Hampshire, United States by SIG Sauer Inc., (formerly SIGARMS Inc.).  Both of these companies along with Swiss Arms AG, Mauser Jagdwaffen GmbH, J.P. Sauer & Sohn, John Rigby & Company, German Sport Guns GmbH and Blaser Jagdwaffen Gmbh are subsidiaries of Luke and Ortmeier Gruppe of Emsdetten, Germany.

Copies of the P226 are produced in China by Norinco, under the name of NP22. These were subcontracted to the Zhejiang Xinhua Machinery Manufacturing Co., Ltd. (浙江省机电集团), known as State Factory 972 or known as the Xinhua Factory and Zhejiang Factory.

The variants consist of the NP22, NP22A, NP34, NP56 and the NP58. The SDM XM9 is a variant of the NP22 chambered in 9x21mm for countries that don't allow any pistol calibers that are only for the military and police. The LP3 and LP4 are versions of the NP22 and NP34 with manual safeties on the slide. The NP762 is chambered to fire 7.62x25mm bullets, which were exported in 2019. They were first made by Xinhua in 1999 and were known then as the NP2000 for potential contracts in China for the PLA and various law enforcement agencies.

The ZOAF is a clone of the P226 made in Iran.

Variants

P226 Navy

U.S. Navy SEAL teams started using the SIG P226 in the 1980s, after German Kampfschwimmer tested them successfully. In 1989, the P226 was adopted by the U.S. Navy SEALs and DEVGRU under the name Mk25 Mod 0.

The first Naval Special Warfare inspired P226 pistols to be offered to the public were the NSW Commemoratives, issued in early 2004. The SIG P226-9-NAVY is a version of the SIG P226 produced that features a stainless steel slide engraved with an anchor to designate them as Naval Special Warfare pistols. SIGARMS raised  $100,000 for the Special Operations Warrior Foundation through the sale of these NSW serialized pistols. The pistol with the serial number NSW0001 was sold during a live auction on the US-wide syndicated Laura Ingraham radio show for an additional $25,000. Later produced commercial versions added a universal rail for accessory attachments while retaining the anchor of previous models, but do not have the SIGLITE Night Sights.

P226 E2

Introduced at the 2010 SHOT Show, the P226 E2 at the time was a significant update to the P226 line. 'E2' (pronounced 'E-squared'), or otherwise known as "Enhanced Ergonomics", is SIG Sauer's attempt to make the large frame gun more ergonomic for persons with small and medium-sized hands. Other standard features include the Short Reset Trigger, aggressive grip finish texture, and a new wrap-around, one-piece grip panel configuration. The gun was discontinued from the P226 model lineup at the end of 2010 but the E2-style grip system has been adopted on and carried over to other P226 variants.

P228 (M11)

A compact version of the P226, the P228 is in use with various law enforcement agencies and also with the United States Armed Forces, where it is designated as the M11. The P228 has a shorter slide and barrel than the P226. Unlike the P226, the P228 is available only in 9×19mm Parabellum with a 13-round magazine, but can also use P226 15- or 20-round magazines. Aftermarket magazines extend the capacity of the P228 to 15 rounds.

From a distance, the P228 can be differentiated from the P226 by comparing the trigger guards (the P228's is curved, while the P226's is slightly hooked) and the barrel and slide lengths (the P228's barrel , thus having a corresponding shorter slide). Also in a side-by-side comparison the P228 would appear slightly shorter ( shorter) than the P226. The larger capacity P226 magazine can also be employed in the P228 although it extends from the base of the grip. Civilian sales of the P228 were discontinued with the introduction of 9mm chambering in the P229 but were recently reintroduced in limited quantities to civilians with an accessory rail and hooked trigger guard, designated the P228R.

The P229 is nearly identical to the P228, however its slide is made from milled stainless steel (versus the P228's folded carbon steel slide) and is available in 9mm, .40 S&W, and .357 SIG.  In the summer of 2012, SIG Sauer announced they were releasing the M11A1, which is essentially the milled-slide P229 chambered in 9mm with P228-labeled grips, a short reset trigger, SIGLITE tritium night sights, Mec-Gar 15-round magazines, and a military style smart tag and serial number. Later in 2012, U.S. Air Force M11b versions of the P228 were released for civilian sale. The M11 is to be replaced in the Army and Air Force through the Modular Handgun System program.
On January 19, 2017, it was announced that the SIG Sauer P320 Compact (M18) had been selected to replace the M11 as the U.S military service pistol. One factor in winning the Modular Handgun System competition was the ability to employ 9mm Parabellum, .357 Sig or .40 S&W cartridges within the same basic frame.

P229
Introduced in 1992, the P229 is an upgrade to the P228 being an identical compact firearm often used for duty or concealed carry purposes. Developed specifically for the US market and assembled with both German and US-made parts, the P229 features a heavier slide to tolerate more powerful rounds the P228 is incapable of. The standard version features a DA/SA trigger. The pistol has also been made available in a  Double Action Kellerman (DAK) model, which is a DAO system with two trigger reset points, and a lighter, smoother pull than that of traditional DAO handguns. Most of the above-mentioned factory variants of the P226 are also available for the P229, including the Equinox option, Elite lineup, as well as a SAS GEN 2 model.

The P229 differs from its cousin the P226 in several respects, and was originally introduced to supplement and then replace the P228 by adding the .357 SIG and .40 S&W as available chamberings.  The P229 was the first production handgun introduced that could chamber the .357 SIG round. The P226 and P228 were originally manufactured using a stamped-steel slide on an aluminum alloy frame. The P229 consists of a CNC-milled stainless steel slide, typically colored black with a Nitron finish.  The P229's milled steel slide was introduced to handle the higher slide velocities created by the .357 SIG and .40 S&W loads, which the stamped slide of the P228 could not handle without the use of a much stiffer recoil spring. This would have made manual slide-retraction much more difficult and the use of a milled stainless slide (coupled with the new milling and stainless production capabilities found in the U.S. factory) with a standard weight recoil spring made more sense.

The slide on the P226 was redesigned in a similar fashion, and civilian sales of the P228 were discontinued in early 2005 due to declining sales and the advent of the P229 in 9mm. The P226 and P229 are both available with optional accessory rails and optional forged stainless steel frames.

The P229 can be chambered in .22 LR, 9mm, .40 S&W or .357 SIG. Changing between .40 S&W and .357 SIG is as simple as switching out the barrel; both calibers use the same magazine. Conversion barrels also allow a P229 or P226 to change between a .40 S&W/.357 SIG to a 9mm caliber.  The 9mm model (both railed and non-railed) can be converted to .22 LR, but in the past its receivers were not designed to provide the space needed for handling the larger rounds of .357 SIG and .40 S&W. As SIG Sauer has slowly begun adopting the E2-style grip system across the P229 model range in 2011—a move similar to what is also happening to the larger P226—they have also begun using the .357 SIG/.40 S&W spec frame dimensions for their factory 9mm P229s, presumably to streamline the number of variations in parts needed to be kept in inventory. Although the manufacturer has announced that older-configuration magazines will continue to operate in the new receiver configuration, SIG Sauer has nonetheless revised new P229 9mm factory magazines to a design that is specific to the resized magazine well of the newly reconfigured receiver/frame.  As a consequence, the newer magazines are not back-compatible, due to their larger width.

P224
The P224 is a subcompact variant of the series. It has a 12-round capacity when chambered in 9mm; it is also available in .357 SIG and .40 S&W. The P224 was introduced in 2012 as double-action only (DAO); it was reintroduced in 2013 as double action / single action (DA/SA) with a decocking lever. The P224 was discontinued in 2016.

Users

See also
 Joint Combat Pistol
 M9 pistol
 Zastava CZ99

References

Bibliography

External links

 Official page
 P226 operator's manual
 P229 operator's manual
 The Arms Site review and history of the P226
 SIG-Sauer P226 pistol (Switzerland) at Modern Firearms
 Pistol Procurement, Allegations on Army Selection of Beretta 9mm. as DOD Standard Sidearm—GAO report, June 1986

.357 SIG semi-automatic pistols
9mm Parabellum semi-automatic pistols
.40 S&W semi-automatic pistols
Semi-automatic pistols of Switzerland
Police weapons
.22 LR pistols
SIG Sauer semi-automatic pistols
Weapons and ammunition introduced in 1983